is a Japanese manga artist, best known for creating the Q.E.D. series.

He made his debut on game-related works for Enix. Presently he publishes his detective manga works on Kodansha.

In 2009, he received the Kodansha Manga Award for his work on Q.E.D..

Works

Q.E.D.
Rocket Man (manga)
C.M.B.

References

External links
Official website 
Official website 

Winner of Kodansha Manga Award (Shōnen)
Living people
Manga artists
Japanese mystery writers
Year of birth missing (living people)